Project.net is an open-source, enterprise scale project management application for Microsoft Windows and Unix operating systems. Project.net is commercial open source. Support and training are available from Project.net Inc. of Bedford, Massachusetts.

History 
Project.net was founded in 1999 to develop project collaboration applications using Internet technologies. The company's initial focus was building and deploying a collaboration engine for use by public and private web-based exchanges. In 2002, PC Magazine awarded Project.net with the Editors' Choice award in a review of web-based project management applications.

Project.net was acquired by Integrated Computer Solutions in 2006 and launched the open source version of Project.net’s project and portfolio management (PPM) application.  The Open Source Business Conference awarded three open source projects (including Project.net) as "ones to watch" shortly after the acquisition.

Project.net is currently used by more than 50,000 people worldwide to help manage their projects.  University Business Magazine published an article on Project and Portfolio Management that reviews the need for and use of Project.net in the facilities department at Cornell University.

Gartner Magic Quadrant 

Project.net is the first Open Source PPM Application to be included in Gartner's: Magic Quadrant for IT Project and Portfolio Management.  Project.net was included in the June 7, 2010 report ID Number: G00200907.

Project.net was also included in the Gartner 2013 and 2014 Report MarketScope for IT Project and Portfolio Management Software Applications .

License 
Project.net is available via the GNU General Public License or a commercial license if preferred by the user. However, Project.net cannot be used without an Oracle database, which is a commercial product.

Usage 
 Project and portfolio management
 Collaboration
 Issue tracking
 Integrated Wiki
 Integrated Blog

See also 

 Project management software
 List of project management software

References

External links
 Project.net website

Free software programmed in Java (programming language)
Free project management software
Free software companies